Wen Xiaoyan (born 12 October 1997) is a Chinese Paralympic athlete. She represented China at the 2016 Summer Paralympics and she won two gold medals and one silver medal. She also won three gold medals at the 2020 Summer Paralympics held in Tokyo, Japan.

She won the gold medal in the women's long jump T37 event and the silver medal in the women's 400 metres T37 event. In the women's 4 × 100 metres relay T35-T38 event she won the gold medal together with Jiang Fenfen, Chen Junfei and Li Yingli.

At the 2017 World Para Athletics Championships held in London, United Kingdom, she won the gold medal in the women's long jump T37 event. Two years later at the 2019 World Para Athletics Championships held in Dubai, United Arab Emirates she won three gold medals and one silver medal. She won the gold medal in the women's 100 metres T37, women's 200 metres T37 and women's long jump T37 events. She also won the silver medal in the 4 x 100 metres relay event.

She won the gold medal in the 200 metres T37 event at the 2020 Summer Paralympics held in Tokyo, Japan. She won the gold medal in the 100 metres T37 event with a world record of 13.00. She also won the gold medal in the Long Jump T37 event.

References

External links 
 

1997 births
Living people
Place of birth missing (living people)
Chinese female long jumpers
Chinese female sprinters
Paralympic athletes of China
Paralympic gold medalists for China
Paralympic silver medalists for China
Athletes (track and field) at the 2016 Summer Paralympics
Athletes (track and field) at the 2020 Summer Paralympics
Medalists at the 2016 Summer Paralympics
Medalists at the 2020 Summer Paralympics
World Para Athletics Championships winners
Paralympic medalists in athletics (track and field)
21st-century Chinese women